The 2013–14 UIC Flames men's basketball team represented the University of Illinois at Chicago in the 2013–14 NCAA Division I men's basketball season. Their head coach was Howard Moore, serving his fourth year. The Flames played their home games at the UIC Pavilion and were members of the Horizon League. They finished the season 6–25, 1–15 in Horizon League play to finish in last place. They lost in the first round of the Horizon League tournament to Valparaiso.

Roster

Schedule

|-
!colspan=9 style="background:#003366; color:#CC0033;"|  Regular season

|-
!colspan=9 style="background:#003366; color:#CC0033;"| 2014 Horizon League tournament

References

UIC Flames
UIC Flames men's basketball seasons
2013 in sports in Illinois
2014 in sports in Illinois